Whitman College is a private liberal arts college in Walla Walla, Washington. The school offers 53 majors and 33 minors in the liberal arts and sciences, and it has a student-to-faculty ratio of 9:1. Whitman was the first college in the Pacific Northwest to install a Phi Beta Kappa chapter, and the first in the U.S. to require comprehensive exams for graduation. Alumni have received 1 Nobel Prize in physics, 1 Presidential Medal of Freedom, 7 Rhodes Scholarships, 1 Marshall Scholarship, 50 Watson Fellowships, and 93 Fulbright Fellowships.

Founded as a seminary by a territorial legislative charter in 1859, the school became a four-year degree-granting institution in 1882 and abandoned its religious affiliation in 1907. It is accredited by the Northwest Association of Schools and Colleges and competes athletically in the NCAA Division III Northwest Conference. Distinguished alumni include Nobel laureate Walter Brattain (inventor of the transistor), William O. Douglas (U.S. Supreme Court Justice from 1939 to 1975), NASA astronaut Dorothy Metcalf-Lindenburger, inventor of the time projection chamber David R. Nygren, Ryan Crocker (U.S. ambassador and Medal of Freedom recipient), actor Adam West, and Neil Kornze director of the Bureau of Land Management.

History

Whitman Seminary 
In 1859, soon after the United States military declared that the land east of the Cascade Mountains was open for settlement by American pioneers, Cushing Eells traveled from the Willamette Valley to Waiilatpu, near present-day Walla Walla, where 12 years earlier, Congregationalist missionaries Dr. Marcus Whitman and Narcissa Whitman, along with 12 others were killed by a group of Cayuse Indians during the Whitman Massacre. While at the site, Eells became determined to establish a "monument" to his former missionary colleagues in the form of a school for pioneer boys and girls. Eells obtained a charter for Whitman Seminary, a pre-collegiate school, from the territorial legislature. From the American Board of Commissioners for Foreign Missions, he acquired the Whitman mission site. Eells soon moved to the site with his family and began working to establish Whitman Seminary.

Despite Eells's desire to locate Whitman Seminary at the Whitman mission site, local pressure and resources provided a way for the school to open in the burgeoning town of Walla Walla. In 1866, Walla Walla's wealthiest citizen, Dorsey Baker, donated land near his house to the east of downtown. A two-story wood-frame building was quickly erected and classes began later that year. The school's first principal, local Congregational minister Peasly B. Chamberlin, resigned within a year and Cushing Eells was called upon to serve as principal, which he did until 1869. After Eells's resignation in 1869, the school struggled—and often failed—to attract students, pay teachers, and stay open for each term.

From seminary to college 
Whitman's trustees decided in 1882 that while their institution could not continue as a prep school, it might survive as the area's only college.  Alexander Jay Anderson, the former president of the Territorial University (now the University of Washington), came to turn the institution into a college and become its president.  After modeling the institution after New England liberal arts colleges, Anderson opened the school on September 4, 1882 (Marcus Whitman's birthday) with an enrollment of 60 students and three senior faculty (Anderson, his wife and son).  In 1883, the school received a collegiate charter and began expanding with aid from the Congregational American College and Education Society.

Financial turmoil and new leadership 
Despite local support for Whitman College and help from the Congregational community, financial troubles set in for the school. After losing favor with some of the school's supporters, Anderson left Whitman in 1891 to be replaced by Reverend James Francis Eaton. The continuing recession of the 1890s increased the institution's financial worries and lost Eaton his backing, leading to his resignation in 1894.

Reverend Stephen Penrose, an area Congregational minister and former trustee, became president of the college and brought the school back to solvency by establishing Whitman's endowment with the aid of D. K. Pearsons, a Chicago philanthropist. By popularizing Marcus Whitman's life and accomplishments (including the false claim that the missionary had been pivotal in the annexation by the United States of Oregon Territory), Penrose was able to gain support and resources for the college. Under his leadership, the faculty was strengthened and the first masonry buildings, Billings Hall and the Whitman Memorial Building, were constructed.

End of religious affiliation 
In 1907, Penrose began a plan called "Greater Whitman" which sought to transform the college into an advanced technical and science center.  To aid fundraising, Penrose abandoned affiliation with the Congregational Church, and became unaffiliated with any denomination.  The prep school was closed and fraternities and sororities were introduced to the campus.  Ultimately, this program was unable to raise enough capital; in 1912, the plan was abandoned and Whitman College returned to being a small liberal arts institution, albeit with increased focus on co-curricular activities. Penrose iterated the school's purpose "to be a small college, with a limited number of students to whom it will give the finest quality of education".  In 1920 Phi Beta Kappa installed a chapter, the first for a Northwest college, and Whitman had its first alum Rhodes Scholar.

World War II 
During World War II, Whitman was one of 131 colleges and universities nationally that took part in the V-12 Navy College Training Program which offered students a path to a Navy commission.

Campus 

Whitman's 117  acre campus is located in downtown Walla Walla, Washington.  Most of the campus is centered around a quad, which serves as the location for intramural field sports.  Around this, Ankeny Field, sits Penrose Library, Olin Hall and Maxey Hall, and two residence halls, Lyman and Jewett. South of Ankeny Field, College Creek meanders through the main campus, filling the artificially created "Lakum Duckum", the heart of campus and the habitat for many of Whitman's beloved ducks.

The oldest building on campus is the administrative center, Whitman Memorial Building, commonly referred to as "Mem". Built in 1899, the hall, like the college, serves as a memorial to Dr. Marcus and Narcissa Prentiss Whitman. The building is the tallest on campus and was placed on the National Historical Register of Historic Places in 1974. The oldest residence halls on campus, Lyman House and Prentiss Hall, were built in 1924 and 1926. Over the next fifty years, the college built or purchased several other buildings to house students, including the former Walla Walla Valley General Hospital, which was transformed into North Hall in 1978. In addition to the nine residence halls, many students choose to live in one of eleven "Interest Houses," run for sophomore, juniors, and seniors committed to specific focuses such as community service, fine arts, environmental studies, multicultural awareness, or the French, Spanish, or German languages. These houses, like most of the residential architecture of Walla Walla, are in the Victorian or Craftsman style.

Of special note: the Johnston Wilderness Campus, which is used for academic and social retreats.

Prentiss Hall 

Named for Marcus's wife, Narcissa Prentiss Whitman, Prentiss Hall is the only all-female dorm and houses first-year residents as well as the four sororities on campus. Whitman's affiliated sororities are Kappa Kappa Gamma, Delta Gamma, Alpha Phi, and Kappa Alpha Theta.

Academics 
Whitman College focuses solely on undergraduate studies in the liberal arts.  All students must take a two-semester course their first year, Encounters, which examines cultural interactions throughout history and gives students a grounding in the liberal arts. Students choose from courses in 48 major fields and 34 minor fields and have wide flexibility in designing independent study programs, electing special majors, and participating in internships and study-abroad programs.  In addition, Whitman is noted for a strong science program. Its most popular majors, based on 2021 graduates, were:
Biological and Biomedical Sciences (33)
Research and Experimental Psychology (32)
Economics (30)
Computer and Information Sciences (18)
Political Science and Government (18)
Astrophysics (16)
Sociology (16)

In early 2021, Whitman president Kathleen Murray proposed substantial cuts to a number of social science, humanities, arts, and other academic programs in anticipation of a $3.5 million budget deficit for the 2021–2022 academic year, prompting criticism from students, faculty, and alumni.

Degrees are awarded after successful completion of senior "comprehensive exams".  These exams vary depending on the students' primary focus of study, but commonly include some combination of (i) a senior thesis, (ii) written examination, and (iii) oral examination. The oral examination is either a defense of the student's senior thesis, or is one or multiple exams of material the student is expected to have learned during their major. The written exam is either a GRE subject test or a test composed by the department.

For students who are interested in foreign policy, Whitman is one of 16 institutions participating in the two-year-old Thomas R. Pickering Foreign Affairs Fellowship program. The State Department pays for fellows to obtain their master's degree at the university of their choice in return for three years of service as a Foreign Service Officer. Whitman has a number of alumni who serve in diplomatic corps.

Combined programs 
Whitman also offers combined programs in conjunction with several institutions throughout the United States:

 3–2 programs in engineering with the California Institute of Technology, Columbia University, University of Washington, and Washington University in St. Louis;
 3–2 programs in forestry and environmental management with Duke University, leading to a Master of Environmental Management or an MBA degree;
 A 3–2 program in oceanography at University of Washington, leading to a Whitman B.A. and a University of Washington B.S. in Oceanography.

Off-campus programs 
Whitman offers a "Semester in the West" program, a field study program in environmental studies, focusing on ecological, social, and political issues confronting the American West. During every other fall semester since 2002, 21 students leave Walla Walla to travel throughout the interior West for field meetings with a variety of leading figures in conservation, ecology, environmental writing, and social justice.

Whitman also offers "The U.S.-Mexico Border Program" every other June. The program is based in Arizona and Sonora, Mexico, and exposes students to a wide range of competing perspectives on the politics of immigration, border enforcement, and globalization.

Since 1982, "Whitman in China" provides Whitman alumni the opportunity to teach English at Northwestern Polytechnical University, Shantou University, or Yunnan University. Participants receive an immersion experience in urban Chinese culture, where they can witness the rapid modernization of the country.  At the same time, Whitman alumni give Chinese university students the rare chance to study with an English native speaker.

Whitman also offers a large range of year- or semester-long off-campus study programs - 88 programs across 40 countries, and a few short-term, faculty-led programs.

Student Engagement Center 
In 2010, under the leadership of (former) President George Bridges, Whitman centralized and integrated various programs intended to help students connect their in-class learning to off-campus work, volunteer, and internship opportunities in the Walla Walla Valley. The office that emerged, the Student Engagement Center (SEC),  houses community service and career services in one place. Students and alumni can get assistance with resumes, cover letters, networking, internships, interviews, grad school applications, and civic engagement in the SEC.

Admissions 
Whitman's admission selectivity is considered "more selective" by U.S. News & World Report.  For the Class of 2023 (enrolling Fall 2019), Whitman received 4,823 applications and accepted 2,697 (55.9%), with 425 enrolling.  The middle 50% range of SAT scores for enrolling freshmen was 630-710 for evidence-based reading and writing, and 610-740 for math.  The middle 50% ACT score range was 25-31 for math, 30-35 for English, and 28-33 for the composite.

For 2020, students of color (including non-citizens) made up 36.8% of the incoming class; international students were 8.8% of enrolling freshmen.

In May 2022, Whitman College announced a $10 million donation made in memory of long time professor of 35 years J.Walter weingart. The donation is set to fund full scholarships for all in-state students with financial need. The J. Waler and Katherine Weingart opportunity scholarship will begin distribution in 2023 and will annually support 500 in-state students.

Athletics 

Whitman holds membership in the NCAA's Northwest Conference (Division III) and fields nine varsity teams each for men and women. More than 20 percent of students participate in a varsity sport. In addition, 70 percent of the student body participates in intramural and club sport. These sports include rugby union, water polo, lacrosse, dodgeball, and nationally renowned cycling and ultimate teams. In 2016, the college adopted the new mascot for the school and its athletes of "the Blues", named after the local mountain range. Whitman's athletic teams had formerly used the nickname "Missionaries" much to the delight of students who proudly identified the Whitman as one of the few institutions that used a sexual position as their mascot; however, their teams are also informally known simply as the "Whitties".

As a junior in 2012–13, basketball player Ben Eisenhardt led the Northwest Conference (NWC) in scoring (442 points), became the first Missionary to be named to the National Association of Basketball Coaches Division 3 All-American Third Team as a junior, and was named NWC Player of the Year.

The club-sport-level Whitman cycling team has won the DII National Championships for two years, and four times in six years, making them the athletic team at Whitman with the most national championships. The women's ultimate team, also a club sports team, finished second to Stanford in Division I play in 2016.
The football program began in 1892 and ended in March 1977; the last winning season was in 1969.

Student life 
Of the 1,579 undergraduate students enrolled in Whitman College in the fall of 2019, 55.3% were female and 44.7% male. There are over one hundred student activities, many of which focus on student activism and social improvement, such as Whitman Direct Action and Global Medicine.  A quarter of the student body participates in some for the college's music program, in one of the 15 music groups and ensembles, including three recognized A cappella groups.

Greek life 
Greek life has a long and storied history at Whitman, with many chapters dating back to a century or more and having the first chapters in the Pacific Northwest. Greek life is notable on campus; there is a high percentage of students, around 33% involved in the Greek system. The four women's sororities are all members of the National Panhellenic Conference and are housed in the Prentiss Hall. The four men's fraternities are housed in fraternity houses north of Isaacs Avenue and are all members of the North American Interfraternity Conference.

The Delta chapter of Phrateres, a non-exclusive, non-profit social-service club, also had a brief existence at Whitman. It was installed there in 1930, but became inactive before 1950.

KWCW 90.5 FM 

KWCW 90.5 FM is a Class A radio station owned and operated by the Whitman Students' Union, the Associated Students of Whitman College (ASWC).

"K-dub" as it is known to students, is located inside the Reid Campus Center on Whitman Campus. At a power of 160 watts, the station's range is approximately 15 miles (24 km), broadcasting as well as streaming online

Notable alumni

Government
 1910 – James Alger Fee, judge of the United States Court of Appeals for the Ninth Circuit
 1920 – William O. Douglas, BA English-Economics, U.S. Supreme Court Justice
 1935 – Al Ullman, U.S. Congressman for 24 years
 1941 – Lucile Lomen, first woman to serve as a law clerk for a Supreme Court justice
 1951 – Jack Burtch, BA Political Science, former Washington State Representative, lawyer and Navy veteran
 1960 – Pat Thibaudeau, BA Psychology, former Washington State Senator
 1963 – W. Michael Gillette, BA, Oregon Supreme Court Justice
 1964 – Walt Minnick, BA, former Idaho Congressman
 1969 – James L. Robart, Judge of the United States District Court for the Western District of Washington
 1971 – Ryan Crocker, BA English, former U.S. Ambassador to Afghanistan, Iraq, Lebanon, Kuwait, Syria, and Pakistan. Recipient of the Presidential Medal of Freedom
 1971 – Ben Westlund, BA Education/History, former Oregon State Treasurer
 2000 – Neil Kornze, BA Politics, former Director of the U.S. Bureau of Land Management
 2006 – Jena Griswold, BA Politics, current Secretary of State of Colorado

Arts and entertainment
 1900 (approximately) - Otto Harbach, MA, lyricist and librettist of about 50 musical comedies, including Rose Marie and The Desert Song.
 1951 – Adam West, BA English, actor, Batman, Family Guy.
 1961 - Morten Lauridsen, composer, Distinguished Professor Emeritus of Composition at the USC Thornton School of Music (transferred to USC after 2 years)
 1967 – Dirk Benedict (Niewoehner), BA Dramatic Art, actor, known for Battlestar Galactica and The A-Team.
 1967 – Craig Lesley, novelist
 1971 – Kathryn Shaw, BA Dramatic Art, artistic director of Studio 58 in Vancouver, British Columbia.
1977 - Stephanie Dorgan, BA Economics, founder and owner of Seattle music venue The Crocodile, former spouse of R.E.M. guitarist Peter Buck
 1977 – Rick Stevenson, BA History, film writer, director and producer.
 1981 – Marcus Amerman, BA Art, artist
 1985 – Lance Norris, BA Dramatic Art, Mystic River.
 1985 – Patrick Page, actor and playwright
 1990 – John Moe, BA Dramatic Art, author and public radio host.
 1998 – Shane Johnson, actor, "Saving Private Ryan", Black Cadillac"
 2002 – Anomie Belle, BA Sociology, professional musician and artivist
 2002 – Lela Loren, BA Theatre, American television actress
 2003 – Cullen Hoback, filmmaker, "Terms and Conditions May Apply"
 2010 – Chastity Belt (band), Indie-rock band formed by Whitman students

Journalism and history
 1933 – Gordon Wright, BA, historian.
 1960 – Douglas Cole, BA Art History, historian specializing in art and Pacific Northwest cultural history.
 1971 – John Markoff, BA Sociology, New York Times journalist and co-author of Takedown.
 2010 – Nate Cohn, BA, journalist for the New York TimesAcademia
 1919 – Frances Penrose Owen, BA Greek, honored for her extensive public service in Seattle, first woman Regent of Washington State University
 1924 – Vladimir Rojansky, physicist, author and educator.
 1944 – Dan Fenno Henderson, founder of the University of Washington Asian law program
 1965 – Ben Kerkvliet, author and educator in the fields of comparative politics, Southeast Asia and Asian studies.
 1970 – Stephen A. Hayner, BA English Literature, president of Columbia Theological Seminary, former president of InterVarsity Christian Fellowship.
 1971 – Paula England, BA Sociology/Psychology, award-winning sociologist, professor at New York University
 1973 – Torey Hayden, BA, Biology/Chemistry, child psychologist, special education teacher, university lecturer and author
 2003 –  Alexander Barnes, BS, chemistry, professor and awardee of Camille Dreyfus Teacher-Scholar Award

Business
 1922 – Ralph Cordiner, BA Economics-Political Science, CEO and chairman, General Electric, Corp.(1958–1963); President (1950–1958)
 1977 – John W. Stanton, BA Political Science, founder and CEO, Western Wireless, majority owner of the Seattle Mariners
 1997 – Gail Gove, BA Politics, General Counsel NBC News Group, former General Counsel Reuters, Adjunct Professor of Media Law, Columbia University Graduate School of Journalism

Science and technology
 1908 – David Crockett Graham, BA, missionary, archeologist, anthropologist, field collector for Smithsonian.
 1918 – Edith Quimby, BA mathematics and physics, medical researcher and physicist
 1921 – Wallace R. Brode, BA, chemist, absorption spectra of dyes.
 1924 – Walter Brattain, BA Physics, physicist, co-inventor of the transistor, Nobel Prize winner.
 1924 – Walker Bleakney, BS Physics, physicist, inventor of mass spectrometer, chair of department of physics at Princeton University.
 1924 – Vladimir Rojansky, BS, physicist, one of the earliest researchers of quantum mechanics
 1924 — E. J. Workman, BS, atmospheric physicist, Fellow of the American Physical Society 
 1931 – Robert Brattain, BA Physics, physicist
 1934 – Bernard Berelson, BA English, behavioral scientist known for work on communication and mass media.
 1960 – David R. Nygren, particle physicist, inventor of the Time projection chamber.
 1965 – Webb Miller, BA, computational biology pioneer. Time 100, 2009: Scientists and Thinkers
 1990 – Gerard van Belle, BA Physics-Astronomy, astronomer.
 1997 – Dorothy Metcalf-Lindenburger, BA Geology, NASA astronaut.

Athletics
 1980 – Derrike Cope, NASCAR driver, 1990 Daytona 500 winner.
 1998 – Tommy Lloyd, head basketball coach, University of Arizona
 2000 – Ingrid Backstrom, BA Geology, professional skier.
 2004 – Holly Brooks, BA Sociology, Environmental Studies, Winter Olympian in Nordic skiing.
 2008 – Mara Abbott, BA Economics, professional cyclist.
 2014 – Ben Eisenhardt (born 1990), American-Israeli professional basketball player in the Israeli Basketball Premier League

Other
 1955 – Colleen Willoughby, philanthropist 
 1974 – Marlin Eller, BA Mathematics, programmer and software developer, co-author of Barbarians Led by Bill Gates 1985 – Steve McConnell, software engineering author, Code Complete''
 1917 – Alan W. Jones (attended), US Army major general
1990's - Richard Garfield, Professor of mathematics, creator of Magic: The Gathering
 2001 – Wanjiru Kamau-Rutenberg, BA Politics, Dr. h.c. Humane Letters, academic and social entrepreneur

References

Further reading

External links

 

 
Private universities and colleges in Washington (state)
Educational institutions established in 1859
Liberal arts colleges in Washington (state)
Universities and colleges accredited by the Northwest Commission on Colleges and Universities
Universities and colleges in Walla Walla, Washington
1859 establishments in Washington Territory